John Henry James Hornsby (18 April 1860 – 9 July 1926) was an English cricketer who played first-class cricket from 1887 to 1898 for Middlesex and various amateur teams. He was born in Grantham; died in Cuckfield Park.

Hornsby was educated at Fettes College and Oxford University. A slow left-arm orthodox bowler, he was the leading wicket-taker on the Lord Hawke's XI tour of Ceylon and India in 1892-93, taking 120 wickets in all matches at an average of 11.26.

References

External links
 

1860 births
1926 deaths
People from Grantham
People educated at Fettes College
English cricketers
Middlesex cricketers
Marylebone Cricket Club cricketers
Gentlemen of England cricketers
East of England cricketers
Lord Hawke's XI cricketers
Oxford and Cambridge Universities Past and Present cricketers
C. I. Thornton's XI cricketers
Hurst Park Club cricketers